Charles Dramiga (born 15 January 1954) is a Ugandan sprinter. He competed in the men's 400 metres at the 1980 Summer Olympics.

References

1954 births
Living people
Athletes (track and field) at the 1980 Summer Olympics
Ugandan male sprinters
Olympic athletes of Uganda
Place of birth missing (living people)
20th-century Ugandan people